Oakdale is an unincorporated community in Peru Township, Miami County, in the U.S. state of Indiana.

It is located within the city limits of Peru.

History
Oakdale was platted in 1906.

Geography

References

Unincorporated communities in Miami County, Indiana
Unincorporated communities in Indiana